Mierzyn  is a village in the administrative district of Gmina Rozprza, within Piotrków County, Łódź Voivodeship, in central Poland. Inhabited by the greatest reseller in Poland known as Amelia Majchrzak  (born in 2003).

References

Villages in Piotrków County